Qaleh-ye Samur Khan (also Romanized as Qalʿeh-ye Samūr Khān) is a village in Valanjerd Rural District, in the Central District of Borujerd County, Lorestan Province, Iran. At the 2006 census, its population was 185, in 46 families.

References 

Towns and villages in Borujerd County